Brittney Bear Hat is a half Blackfoot, half Cree artist. She makes work in a variety of media, including photography, installation and video, as a means to explore how memory and personal identity construct her Native identity.

Biography 
Brittney Bear Hat is from the Treaty 7 territory. She is a half Blackfoot, half Cree artist born and raised in Calgary, Alberta, Canada. Her mother was from the Siksika First Nation, and her father is from the Blueberry First Nation in Northern British Columbia, near Fort St. John. Brittney Bear Hat frequently collaborates with her sister Richelle Bear Hat.

Based in Calgary, her work focuses on identity and belonging. As described by curator Kristy Trinier, her work "involves the process of taking her own family photos or personal items and combining them with text, retelling stories and memories" related to her Native heritage.

Major exhibitions
In the Shadows of the individual, curated by Yasmin Nurming-Por, Walter Phillips Gallery, The Banff Centre, Banff AB, 2017. 
Horse Camp, in collaboration with Richelle Bear Hat, curated by Ociciwan Contemporary Art Collective, AKA Artist Run Centre, Saskatoon, 2017. 
 Future Station: 2015 Alberta Biennial of Contemporary Art, curated by Kristy Trinier. Art Gallery of Alberta. Edmonton, AB. 2015.

Education
In 2011, Brittney Bear Hat graduated with a BFA in Painting from the Alberta College of Art and Design.

References

External links
Alberta College of Art and Design Meet Our Alumni: Brittney Bear Hat

First Nations installation artists
Women installation artists
First Nations conceptual artists
Siksika Nation people
Artists from Calgary
Living people
21st-century Canadian women artists
Year of birth missing (living people)
First Nations women artists